The Estonia national beach soccer team represents Estonia in international beach soccer competitions and is controlled by the Estonian FA, the governing body for football in Estonia. The Estonia national football team played their first FIFA Beach Soccer World Cup qualifier in August 2007, losing 1–3 to Ukraine.

Current squad
 

 (captain)

Managers

Euro Beach Soccer League record
 1998–2007 – Did not participate
 2008 – 7th in Stage 2
 2009–2011 – Did not participate
 2012 – 5th in Division B
 2013 – 7th in Division B (Promotional Final)
 2014 – 8th in Division B (Promotional Final)
 2015 – 2nd in Division B (Promotional Final)
 2016 – 4th in Division B (Promotional Final)
 2017 – 2nd in Division B (Promotional Final)
 2018 – 9th in Division B
 2019 – 7th in Division B (Promotional final)
Note: Estonia replaced withdrawn Bulgaria in Promotion Final in this season
 2020 – Did not participate due to COVID-19 pandemic
 2021 – 1st in Division B (Promotional Final)
 2022 – TBD in Division A

FIFA Beach Soccer World Cup record
 1995–2006 – Did not participate
 2007–2021 – Did not qualify

References

External links
 Estonian Beach Soccer Association homepage
 Estonia national beach soccer team at BSWW
 Profile on Beach Soccer Russia

European national beach soccer teams
Beach soccer
Beach soccer in Estonia